Lupinoblennius vinctus, the mangrove blenny, is a species of combtooth blenny found in the western central Atlantic ocean, from southern Florida and the Antilles as well as from Mexico to Panama where it has reached the Pacific end of the Panama Canal.  This species reaches a length of  TL.

References

vinctus
Fish described in 1867